Blood, Fire & Live is the first live album by Scottish rock band The Almighty, recorded on their "Wild and Wonderful" tour in July 1990 and released in October that year. The title, and defaced album cover itself, is a pun on their first album which immediately preceded it (Blood, Fire & Love). All of the tracks, except "You Ain't Seen Nothin' Yet" which is a cover of a Bachman–Turner Overdrive song, appeared on that first album too. The album was re-released by Spinefarm Records in 2015 as the second disc in a three-disc deluxe edition of Blood, Fire & Love.

Track listing 
All songs written by Ricky Warwick, except as indicated.

"Full Force Lovin' Machine" (London, Warwick, Munroe, Tantrum) – 3:51
"You've Gone Wild" – 4:01
"Lay Down the Law" (Warwick, Tantrum) – 4:15
"Blood, Fire and Love" – 4:52
"Destroyed" – 3:50
"Wild and Wonderful" (London, Warwick) – 7:53
"Resurrection Mutha" (Warwick, Tantrum)- 3:36
"You Ain't Seen Nothin' Yet" (Randy Bachman) – 3:40 (Bachman–Turner Overdrive cover)

Personnel 
The Almighty
Ricky Warwick – vocals, guitars
Tantrum – guitars
Stump Munroe – drums, percussion, vocals
Floyd London – bass

Production
 Co-produced, engineered, mixed by, recorded by – John Cornfield
 Mastered by – Arun Chakraverty
 Live sound mixed by – Martin Walker
 Co-producer – The Almighty
 Recorded by [assistants] – Alan Stone, Ian Bridges

1990 live albums
The Almighty (band) albums
Polydor Records live albums